This is a list of compositions by Fabio Vacchi.

By genre

Works for the stage
Girotondo (1982), opera in 2 acts, loosely adapted from Arthur Schnitzler’s Reigen by Roberto Roversi, commissioned by the Maggio Musicale Fiorentino
Il Viaggio (1990), opera in 2 acts, libretto by Tonino Guerra, commissioned by the Teatro Comunale di Bologna
La station thermale (1993), dramma giocoso in 3 acts,  libretto by Myriam Tanant after Carlo Goldoni’s I bagni d’Abano, commissioned by the Opéra National de Lyon
Scena per Doktor Faustus (1995), choreographed poem by Heinrich Heine for 2 magnetic tapes, libretto by Lorenzo Salveti, commissioned by the Bologna Teatro Comunale.
Dioniso germogliatore (1996), ballet in 5 tableaux, text by Giuliano Scabia, commissioned by the Ravenna Festival
Les oiseaux de passage (1998), opera in 5 sequences, libretto by Myriam Tanant, commissioned by the Opéra National de Lyon and the Bologna Teatro Comunale.
La burla universale. Cantata abbastanza profana (2001), in one act, for female voice,  2 baritone voices, and orchestra, libretto by Franco Marcoaldi, commissioned by Rai Radio Tre for centennial of Verdi’s death
Il letto della Storia (2003), opera in 3 acts, libretto by Franco Marcoaldi, commissioned by the Maggio Musicale Fiorentino
Macbeth (2007), incidental music for the marionette production of the Compagnia Marionettistica Carlo Colla e Figli
La madre del mostro (2007), libretto by Michele Serra, commissioned by the Accademia Musicale Chigiana
Teneke (2007), opera in 3 acts, libretto by Franco Marcoaldi on a subject of Yashar Kemal, commissioned by the Teatro alla Scala of Milan.

Choral and vocal works
Ballade (1978) for soprano and chamber orchestra, text of William Butler Yeats
Continuo (1979) for soprano and instruments, text of Dino Campana
Scherzo (1979) for soprano and chamber orchestra, text of Tonino Guerra
Arietta Pensiero non darti (1980) for flute and soprano, or also, from the opera Girotondo for flute solo
Grande Aria A guardar (1981) for soprano and instruments, from the opera Girotondo
Trois vision de Geneviève (1981) for 11 string soloists and a child’s voice
Dona nobis pacem (1994) for double chorus, on 3 subjects of Claudio Monteverdi from the Missa in illo tempore
Mignon (über die Sehnsucht) (1995) for voice and piano, text of Johann Wolfgang Goethe
Briefe Büchners (1996), six lieder for baritone, bass clarinet, and piano on fragments of the letters of Georg Büchner, commissioned by Claudio Abbado and the Berliner Festwochen
Dioniso germogliatore II – un recitar sinfonico (1997) for narrator and orchestra, text of Giuliano Scabia
Sacer sanctus (1997), cantata for mixed chorus and ensemble, text of Giuseppe Pontiggia
Io vorrei, superato ogni tremore (1998) for soprano and ensemble, text of Alda Merini, commissioned by the festival Milano Musica
Die neugeborne Ros’entzückt (1998) for soprano and orchestra
Tre veglie (1999) for mezzo-soprano, cello, and orchestra, text of Franco Marcoaldi, commissioned by the Salzburg Festival
La prima figura da sinistra (2000) for voice and bass clarinet
Terra comune (2002) for chorus and orchestra, text of Franco Marcoaldi, commissioned by the Accademia Nazionale di Santa Cecilia
Canti di Benjaminovo (2003) for voice and string quintet, text of Franco Marcoaldi, commissioned by the Boston Musica Viva Ensemble
Memoria italiana (2003) for 4 voices, text of Franco Marcoaldi, commissioned by the Festival delle Nazioni of Città di Castello
Cjante (2004) for soprano and orchestra on a fragment of the Song of Songs translated in the Friuli dialect, commissioned by the Mittelfest of Cividale del Friuli
Irini, Esselam, Shalom (2004) for voice, violin concertante,  and orchestra, text edited by Moni Ovadia, commissioned by the Orchestra Sinfonica di Milano “G. Verdi”
Noc’ (2004) for soprano and piano, text of Aleksandr Pushkin
Voce d’altra voce (2005) for two narrators, chorus and orchestra, on a fragment of the Song of songs translated in Arabic, Hebrew, and the Friuli dialect, commissioned by the Mittelfest of Cividale del Friuli
Mi chiamo Roberta (2006) for violin, cello, percussion, piano and two narrators, text of Aldo Nove, commissioned by the Mittelfest of Cividale del Friuli
La giusta armonia (2006) for narrator and orchestra, text of Franz Heinrich Ziegenhagen, commissioned by the Salzburg Festival

Symphonic works
Sinfonia in quattro tempi (1976)
Poemetto (Nell’ali dei vivi pensieri) (1984)
Danae (1989)
Scramlézz d’estèd (1991)
Dai calanchi di Sabbiuno (1997) for large orchestra, transcribed for the Gustav Mahler Youth Orchestra
En Vinternatt (2001), commissioned by Ferrara Musica
Diario dello sdegno (2002), commissioned by Teatro alla Scala
Canti d’ombre (2004), commissioned by Orchestra Nazionale della RAI
Dionysos suite (2004)
Movimento di quartetto (2006) for orchestra, commissioned by the Accademia Musicale di San Giorgio
Mare che fiumi accoglie (2007), commissioned by the Accademia Nazionale di Santa Cecilia

Works for soloist and orchestra
Concerto per pianoforte e orchestra (1983)
Notturno concertante (1994) for guitar and orchestra
Veglia in canto (2003) for violin and string orchestra, commissioned by the Festival of the City of Portogruaro
Lydia (2004) for violin and string orchestra
Voci di notte (2006) for violin concertante/solo and orchestra, commissioned by the Maggio Musicale Fiorentino for Zubin Mehta’s 70th birthday

Chamber music
Les soupirs de Geneviève (1975) for 11 string instruments
Fantasia (1977) for 3 string instruments and harpsichord
Il cerchio e gli inganni (1982) for chamber orchestra
Convegno (1984) for flute and piano
L’usgnol in vatta a un fil (1985) for ensemble
Trio (1987) for flute, bass clarinet, (untuned) violin, cello and harp, from Luoghi immaginari
Quartetto for Bruno Maderna (1989) for A clarinet, vibraphone, viola and piano, from Luoghi immaginari
Quintetto (1987) for flute, bass clarinet, violin, cello and harp, from Luoghi immaginari
Sestetto (1990)
Ottetto for Luigi Nono (1991) from Luoghi immaginari
Quartetto per archi n° 1 (1992)
Settimino (1992) from Luoghi immaginari
Klaviertrio (1993) for violin, cello, and piano
6 variazioni (1994) for ensemble
Dai calanchi di Sabbiuno (1995) for 5 performers, commissioned by the Teatro alla Scala
2 Pezzi op. 45 (1995) for oboe, double bass, and piano
Wanderer-Oktett (1997), commissioned by the European Soloist Chamber Ensemble
Capriccio sopra La station thermale (1997) for 2 pianos
Dai calanchi di Sabbiuno (1998) for chamber orchestra
Movimento di quartetto (1999) for strings
Intrada (1999) for B-flat trumpet and piano
Wanderer-Sextett (2000) for 2 violins, 2 violas, and 2 cellos, commissioned by the Soloists of the Mahler Chamber Orchestra
Orna buio ciel (2000) for violin, cello, and piano
Suono di canna (2000) for 6 instruments
Passacaglia (2000) for bass clarinet and bass tuba
Apocrifo (2000) for 5 instruments
Quartetto per archi n° 3 (2001), commissioned by the Tokyo String Quartet
Quartetto per archi n° 4 (2004), commissioned by RAI Radio for the 80th anniversary of Italian radio

Works for a solo instrument
...di altri echi (1982) for violin
Languido nascente(1983) for piano
Plynn (1986) for guitar
In alba mia, dir... (1995) for cello
Interludio e Recitativo da Languido nascente (1995) for piano
Presto, da boschi e prati (1999) for violin
Tempo d’arco (2000) for double bass
Respiri (2004) for violin
Echi d’ombre (2005) for piano, commissioned by Per Piano Solo Meeting

Film score
Soundtrack of The Profession of Arms (2001), a film directed by Ermanno Olmi
In pace, in canto, music accompanying the credits of Cantando dietro i paraventi (2003), a film directed by Ermanno Olmi
Soundtrack of Gabrielle (2005), a film directed by Patrice Chéreau
Soundtrack of Centochiodi (2007), a film directed by Ermanno Olmi

Transcriptions and re-elaborations
Francesco Paolo Tosti, Four Melodies, transcription for voice and orchestra (1985)
Hugo Wolf, Two Lieder, from the Spanisches Liederbuch, transcription for voice and instruments (1993)
John Dowland, Flow My Dowland, 5 Songs of John Dowland transcribed and orchestrated for alto voice and ensemble (1994)
Johann Sebastian Bach, Contrapunctus V from The Art of Fugue,  re-elaboration for orchestra (2001)
César Franck, Sonata for violin and piano, transcription for violin and strings (2005)

Lists of compositions by composer